Cifu may refer to:

 Cifu (footballer, born 1980), full name Daniel Cifuentes Alfaro, Spanish footballer
 Cifu (footballer, born 1990), full name Miguel Ángel Garrido Cifuentes, Spanish footballer
 David Xavier Cifu (born 1962), American physiatrist, researcher, and medical educator

Nicknames